Siquijor State College is the only state college in the island province of Siquijor, Central Visayas, Philippines.

Campuses
It has one satellite campus located in the town of Lazi.

History 
Siquijor State College was founded in 1920 by Lt. Governor Vicente Villanueva. It was then called as the Larena High School (LHS) that offered only the first and the second-year levels, one section per curriculum-year level with only two teachers including the principal and was under the supervision of the Negros Oriental Provincial High School (NOPHS) in Dumaguete.

Nine years later (1929), it operated as a complete secondary school and was renamed the Larena Sub-Provincial High School (LSPHS). On 1 July 1960, by virtue of Republic Act No. 2423, the school was converted into a vocational school offering the Secondary Trades Curriculum. This time the school was renamed Larena National Vocational School (LNVS). As the only vocational school in the province, it offered collegiate technical courses and evening opportunity classes.

The National Assembly approved Batasang Pambansa Blg. 387 on 14 April 1983 and LNVS became the Larena National Vocational College (LNVC). Through the joint efforts of Cong. Orlando B. Fua Sr., then representative of the lone district of Siquijor and Cong. Miguel Romero of the 2nd District of Negros Oriental and the constituents of Siquijor, House Bill No. 412 was enacted into law by President Fidel V. Ramos on March 3, 1995, through Republic Act No. 7947. This law converted LNVC to Siquijor State College and authorized the college to offer additional courses in addition to its existing curricular offerings.

Former college presidents:
Dr. Tirso L. Tan Sr. (1995-1999)
Dr. Rosita T. Bidad, Officer-in-Charge (1999-2000)
Dr. Dominador Q. Cabanganan (2000-2008)
Dr. Baldomero R. Martinez Jr. (2008-2013)
Dr. Maria Imogen T. Quilicot (2013-2020)

References

 SUNRISE, A Journal of the Secondary Education Department, College of Education Research and Development, 1(1), June 2004-March 2005, pp. 11–14.
 SUNRISE, A Journal of the Secondary Education Department, College of Education Research and Development, 2(1), June 2005-December 2006, pp. 11–16.
 Siquijor State College https://siquijorstate.edu.ph
 Siquijor State College https://www.facebook.com/siquijorstatecollege.officialpage

External links
 

State universities and colleges in the Philippines
Educational institutions established in 1920
Universities and colleges in Siquijor
1920 establishments in the Philippines